Raúl Lall (born July 27, 1994) is a Guyanese judoka who competes in the men's 60 kg category. At the 2012 Summer Olympics, he was defeated in the second round by Eisa Majrashi.

References

Guyanese male judoka
1994 births
Living people
Olympic judoka of Guyana
Judoka at the 2012 Summer Olympics
Sportspeople from Georgetown, Guyana